Orange Brunt was a state legislator in Mississippi. He served in the Mississippi House of Representatives from 1874 to 1875 representing Panola County. He had a wife named Thursday and children.

In November 1873, the Memphis Daily Appeal lamented his election but reassured that he and Dan Matthews were not "vicious Negroes". An October 25, 1875 news brief in The Clarion-Ledger described him as a Radical Republican and states that he withdrew his candidacy (presumably for re-election) due to a "game" planned by Republican Party leaders and Urbain Ozanne, a sheriff in Panola County who tried to rein in Ku Klux Klan violence and murders. This ended up being the Mississippi Plan, a Southern Democrat strategy in 1875, whereby the involved parties would use threats and violence to eliminate African American voters and restore white supremacy.

See also
African-American officeholders during and following the Reconstruction era

References

Year of birth missing
Year of death missing
Date of death missing
African-American politicians during the Reconstruction Era
Members of the Mississippi House of Representatives
People from Panola County, Mississippi
Radical Republicans